Juan Fernando "Juanfi" Garro (born 24 November 1992) is an Argentine professional footballer who plays as a forward for Huracán, on loan at Newell's Old Boys.

Career
Garro started his senior career with Godoy Cruz. He made his professional debut in April 2011 during a 3–1 win over Huracán, prior to scoring his first goal for the club on his Copa Argentina debut against Sportivo Italiano on 24 November 2011 while his first league goal came in the Argentine Primera División in April 2012 versus Newell's Old Boys. In total, Garro scored sixteen times in eighty-two games in all competitions throughout his first eight seasons with Godoy Cruz between 2011 and 2017. After nine campaigns, Garro left in July 2018 to play for Huracán.

Career statistics
.

References

External links

1992 births
Living people
Sportspeople from Mendoza, Argentina
Argentine footballers
Association football forwards
Argentine Primera División players
Godoy Cruz Antonio Tomba footballers
Club Atlético Huracán footballers
Newell's Old Boys footballers